Toeterville (also Toeter) is an unincorporated community and census-designated place in northwestern Mitchell County, Iowa, United States.  It lies along local roads northwest of the city of Osage, the county seat of Mitchell County.  Its elevation is 1,194 feet (364 m).  Toeterville's post office was established on 1898-02-17 and discontinued on 1985-01-30, when it was attached to the St. Ansgar post office.  Although its post office is gone, Toeterville retains its own ZIP Code, 50481.

History
Toeterville was platted in 1898. It was named for its founders, . Toeterville's population was 25 in 1902, and also 25 in 1925.

Demographics

As of the census of 2010, there were 48 people, 23 households, and 13 families residing in the town. The racial makeup of the town was 100.0% White.

There were 23 households, out of which 26.1% had children under the age of 18 living with them, 39.1% were married couples living together, 4.3% had a female householder with no husband present, 13.0% had a male householder with no wife present, and 43.5% were non-families. 34.8% of all households were made up of individuals, and 17.3% had someone living alone who was 65 years of age or older. The average household size was 2.09 and the average family size was 2.77.

In the city the population was spread out, with 22.9% under the age of 18, 8.4% from 18 to 24, 25.1% from 25 to 44, 27.2% from 45 to 64, and 16.7% who were 65 years of age or older. The median age was 40 years. The gender makeup of the city was 60.4% male and 39.6% female.

References

Unincorporated communities in Mitchell County, Iowa
Unincorporated communities in Iowa